The 2014–15 season was Milton Keynes Dons' eleventh season in their existence as a professional association football club, and their seventh consecutive season competing in Football League One.

As well as competing in League One, the club also participated in the FA Cup, League Cup and League Trophy.

The season covers the period from 1 July 2014 to 30 June 2015.

Season review
With what turned out to be a successful summer transfer window, manager Karl Robinson signed forwards Benik Afobe and Will Grigg on loan from Arsenal and Brentford respectively, as well as former loanee Samir Carruthers from Aston Villa on a permanent deal. Centre-back Kyle McFadzean was also brought in from Crawley Town.

Following a 3–1 home victory over rivals AFC Wimbledon in the first round at the beginning of August, the club were handed a lucrative second round League Cup draw at home to Manchester United. Against all odds, the Dons won the tie 4–0 through goals from Grigg and Afobe against a United team which included established Premier League players David de Gea, Javier Hernandez, Shinji Kagawa and Danny Welbeck.

The result set the tone for the remainder of the season. The Dons spent the majority of the year in promotion contention and achieved several notable victories including a club record 7–0 home win over Oldham Athletic, a 6–0 home win over Colchester United and 6–1 home wins over both Crewe Alexandra and Leyton Orient. At the end of the January 2015 transfer window, academy graduate Dele Alli was sold to Premier League side Tottenham Hotspur for a club record fee in the region of £5m plus add-on incentives and arrangements which included Alli being loaned back immediately for the remainder of the campaign.

For the final few weeks of the season, the club were in competition with Preston North End and Swindon Town for second place (the final automatic promotion spot). With a considerable points gap to claw back, the Dons managed to obtain 25 points from a possible 27 to ensure the battle for promotion came down to the final day.

With Preston in second place on 89 points and MK Dons in third on 88, Preston faced relegation-threatened Colchester United and only needed to match or better the Dons' result against already relegated Yeovil Town to ensure promotion. MK Dons went on to defeat Yeovil 5–1. With Preston losing away to Colchester, the Dons secured second place against the odds, achieving promotion to the second tier for the first time since their formation in 2004 along with a club record goal tally of 101 league goals.

Competitions

League One

Final table

Source: Sky Sports

Matches

FA Cup

Matches

League Cup

Matches

League Trophy

Matches

Player details
 Note: Players' ages as of the club's opening fixture of the 2014–15 season.

Transfers

Transfers in

Transfers out

Loans in

Loans out

Awards
PFA Team of the Year 2014–15 League One: Dele Alli
EFL Young Player of the Year 2014–15: Dele Alli
EFL League One Player of the Month November 2014: Carl Baker
EFL League One Player of the Month January 2015: Dele Alli
EFL Young Player of the Month August 2014: Dele Alli
EFL League One Manager of the Month January 2015: Karl Robinson 
EFL League One Manager of the Month April 2015: Karl Robinson

References

External links

Official Supporters Association website
MK Dons news on MKWeb

Milton Keynes Dons F.C. seasons
Milton Keynes Dons